Portneuf is a provincial electoral district in the Capitale-Nationale region of Quebec, Canada, which elects members to the National Assembly.  It notably includes the municipalities of Saint-Raymond, Pont-Rouge, Donnacona and Neuville.

It was created for the 1867 election (and an electoral district of that name existed earlier in the Legislative Assembly of the Province of Canada and the Legislative Assembly of Lower Canada).

In the change from the 2001 to the 2011, it lost some territory to Laviolette and La Peltrie electoral districts.

Members of the Legislative Assembly / National Assembly

Election results

|-
 
|Liberal
|Michel Matte
|align="right"|11,055
|align="right"|39.58
|align="right"| +7.40

|}

|-
 
|Liberal
|Jean-Pierre Soucy
|align="right"|10,861
|align="right"|32.18
|align="right"|

|-

|}

References

External links
Information
 Elections Quebec

Election results
 Election results (National Assembly)

Maps
 2011 map (PDF)
 2001 map (Flash)
2001–2011 changes (Flash)
1992–2001 changes (Flash)
 Electoral map of Capitale-Nationale region
 Quebec electoral map, 2011 

Portneuf